The following is a list of Registered Historic Places in Shiawassee County, Michigan.



|}

See also

 List of Michigan State Historic Sites in Shiawassee County, Michigan
 List of National Historic Landmarks in Michigan
 National Register of Historic Places listings in Michigan
 Listings in neighboring counties: Clinton, Genesee, Gratiot, Ingham, Livingston, Saginaw

References

Shiawassee County
Shiawassee County, Michigan